Muriel Streeter (1913–1995) was an American artist known for her surrealist and neo-romantic paintings. Her work is included in the collections of the Smithsonian American Art Museum,
the Wadsworth Atheneum Museum of Art,and The Philadelphia Museum of Art.

References

1913 births
1995 deaths
American surrealist artists
20th-century American women artists
Artists from New Jersey
People from Vineland, New Jersey
Artists in the Smithsonian American Art Museum collection